Qasr-e Qand District is a district (bakhsh) in Nik Shahr County, Sistan and Baluchestan Province, Iran. At the 2006 census, its population was 37,722, in 6,752 families.  The District has one city: Qasr-e Qand.

References 

Nik Shahr County
Districts of Sistan and Baluchestan Province